Company of Strangers may refer to:
 Company of Strangers (group) Australian supergroup (1992-1993)
 Company of Strangers (Company of Strangers album), 1993
 Company of Strangers (Bad Company album), 1995
 Company of Strangers (Colin Hay album), 2002